"Alone with You" is a song written by Jackie DeShannon and performed by Brenda Lee.  The song reached #8 on the adult contemporary chart and #48 on the Billboard Hot 100 in 1964.  It also reached #32 in Canada.

The single's B-side, "My Dreams", reached #85 on the Billboard Hot 100.

References

1964 songs
1964 singles
Songs written by Jackie DeShannon
Brenda Lee songs
Decca Records singles